Ángel Pacheco may refer to:
 Ángel Pacheco (general)
 Ángel Pacheco (boxer)
 Ángel Pacheco (wrestler)